This page lists peer-reviewed academic journals in educational psychology and closely related fields.
Academy of Management Learning & Education
American Journal of Distance Education
African Journal of Educational Studies in Mathematics and Sciences
American Educational Research Journal
British Educational Research Journal
British Journal of Educational Psychology
Child Development
Early Childhood Research Quarterly
Educational and Psychological Measurement
Educational Psychology
Educational Research Review
Educational Researcher
Elementary School Journal
Gifted Child Quarterly
Intelligence
International Journal of Behavioral Development
Journal of Educational and Behavioral Statistics
Journal of Educational Measurement
Journal of Educational Psychology
Journal of Learning Disabilities
Journal of the Learning Sciences
Journal of Psychological Science
Journal of Research in Reading
Learning and Individual Differences
Reading Research Quarterly
Review of Educational Research
Review of Research in Education
Science Education

 
Educational psychology